The traditional New Year in many South and Southeast Asian cultures is based on the sun's entry into the constellation Aries. In modern times, it is usually reckoned around the 14th of April.

Origins

As most countries and cultures of South and Southeast Asia lie within the Indian cultural sphere, the development of their traditional calendars have been strongly influenced by some form of the Hindu calendar. As in many other calendars, the New Year was based on the northern hemisphere vernal equinox (the beginning of spring). However, the Hindu calendar year was based on the sidereal year (i.e. the movement of the sun relative to the stars), while the Western Gregorian calendar is based on the tropical year (the cycle of seasons).

In ancient times, the sun's entry into Aries coincided with the equinox. However, due to the earth's axial precession, the sidereal year is slightly longer than the tropical year, causing the dates to gradually drift apart. Today, the sun's entry into Aries occurs around 18 April, according to astronomical definitions. Some traditional calendars are still marked by the sun's actual movements while others have since been fixed to the Gregorian calendar.

Celebrations

The specific New Year observances include:

 In South Asia:
 Bohag Bihu: Assam, India
 Baisakh Ek Gate or Bisket Jatra : Nepal
 Pahela Baishakh: Bangladesh and West Bengal, India
 Pana Sankranti: Odisha, India
 Sangken: Khamti, Singpho, Khamyang, Tangsa in Arunachal Pradesh and Tai Phake, Tai Aiton, and Turung in Assam
 Bwisagu: Bodoland region of Assam, India
 Buisu: Tripura, India
 Bizhu: Chakmas in Mizoram, Tripura and Bangladesh
 Puthandu: Tamil Nadu and Puducherry, India and Northern and Eastern regions of Sri Lanka
 Vishu: Kerala, India
 Bisu: Tulu Nadu region of Karnataka and Kerala, India
 Jur Sital: Mithila region of Bihar, India and Nepal
 Vaisakhi: Punjab, North and Central India, Nepalese New Year in Nepal
 Aluth Avurudda: Sri Lanka
 In Southeast Asia:
 Thingyan: Myanmar
 Pi Mai: Laos
 Songkran: Thailand
  Choul Chnam Thmey or Moha Sankranti : Cambodia
 Water-Sprinkling Festival: Dais in Sipsongpanna in Yunnan, China

Gallery

See also
Indian New Year's days
Water Festival
Sidereal and tropical astrology

References

New Year celebrations
April observances
South Asian culture
Southeast Asian culture